Pearl River is a railroad station in Pearl River, New York. It serves NJ Transit and Metro-North Railroad trains on the Pascack Valley Line. It is located at 35 South Main Street between West Central Avenue and Jefferson Avenue. Pearl River is the last station in New York, heading from Spring Valley towards Hoboken Terminal.

History

The land donated for the station came from Julius Braunsdorf, a local entrepreneur, who won a lawsuit against the Singer Corporation. Braunsdorf opened Central Avenue, the local post office, and the railroad station. Known as Muddy Brook, Braunsdorf suggested the hamlet be renamed for the pearls in the local river. Braunsdorf built originally two facilities at Pearl River, but some time after 1880, these were merged into one structure.

Station layout
The station has one track and one low-level side platform.

Like many Metro-North stations east of the Hudson, permit parking is operated by LAZ Parking. Pearl River's parking lot accommodates 170 vehicles.

Bibliography

References

External links

Pearl River Station (Existing Railroad Stations in New York State)
 Station from Central Avenue from Google Maps Street View
 Station House from Google Maps Street View

NJ Transit Rail Operations stations
Railway stations in Rockland County, New York
Former Erie Railroad stations
Railway stations in the United States opened in 1871
1871 establishments in New York (state)